The 2003 Hastings Direct International Championships was a women's tennis tournament played on grass courts at the Eastbourne Tennis Centre in Eastbourne in the United Kingdom that was part of Tier II of the 2003 WTA Tour. It was the 29th edition of the tournament and was held from 16 June through 21 June 2003. Chanda Rubin won the singles title.

Finals

Singles

 Chanda Rubin defeated  Conchita Martínez 6–4, 3–6, 6–4
 It was Rubin's 2nd singles title of the year and the 7th of her career.

Doubles

 Lindsay Davenport /  Lisa Raymond defeated  Jennifer Capriati /  Magüi Serna 6–3, 6–2
 It was Davenport's 3rd doubles title of the year and the 73rd of her career. It was Raymond's 3rd doubles title of the year and the 39th of her career.

External links 
 ITF Tournament Profile

References

Hastings Direct International Championships
Hastings Direct International Championships
Hastings Direct International Championships
Eastbourne International
2003 in English tennis